The European Convention for the Protection of Pet Animals is a treaty of the Council of Europe to promote the welfare of pet animals and ensure minimum standards for their treatment and protection. The treaty was signed in 1987 and became effective on 1 May 1992, after at least four countries had ratified it. Adherence to the treaty is open and not limited to member countries of the Council of Europe. As of June 2020, it has been ratified by 24 states (most recently by Spain in July 2017).

Content
The convention is divided into seven chapters:
 General provisions
 Principles for the keeping of pet animals
 Supplementary measures for stray animals
 Information and education
 Multilateral consultations
 Amendments
 Final provisions

Parties 

As of June 2020, the Netherlands is the only state that has signed but not ratified the treaty yet.

A review of the treaty performed in 1995 resulted in minor modifications of the text and allowed signatory states to declare themselves exempt from certain paragraphs of the treaty. Subsequently, a number of additional countries signed and ratified the treaty, making use of this provision by declaring themselves exempt from the prohibition of tail docking. No country that has ratified the treaty has made any reservations regarding the other cosmetic surgeries prohibited by §10: cropping of ears, removal of vocal cords, and declawing.

See also 
 Animal law
 Animal rights by country or territory
 Cruelty to animals
 List of Council of Europe treaties
 List of international animal welfare conventions

References

External links 
Details of Treaty No.125 – European Convention for the Protection of Pet Animals.
European Convention for the Protection of Pet Animals, Treaty available in ECOLEX-the gateway to environmental law (English)

Fauna of Europe
Animal welfare and rights legislation
Council of Europe treaties
1987 in France
Treaties concluded in 1987
Treaties entered into force in 1992
Treaties of Austria
Treaties of Azerbaijan
Treaties of Belgium
Treaties of Bulgaria
Treaties of Cyprus
Treaties of the Czech Republic
Treaties of Denmark
Treaties of Finland
Treaties of France
Treaties of Germany
Treaties of Greece
Treaties of Italy
Treaties of Latvia
Treaties of Lithuania
Treaties of Luxembourg
Treaties of Norway
Treaties of Portugal
Treaties of Romania
Treaties of Serbia
Treaties of Sweden
Treaties of Switzerland
Treaties of Turkey
Treaties of Ukraine
Animal treaties
Treaties extended to French Polynesia
Treaties extended to New Caledonia
Treaties extended to the French Southern and Antarctic Lands